Luchob is a village and jamoat in Tajikistan. It is located in Varzob District, one of the Districts of Republican Subordination. The jamoat has a total population of 7,174 (2015). Villages: Alkhuch, Durmonbuloq, Kosataroshi Bolo, Kosataroshi Poyon, Luchob, Novakandoz, Sayyod, Sarinay, Chorvodor.

References

Populated places in Districts of Republican Subordination
Jamoats of Tajikistan